Clarence Cross (born Clarence Crause; March 4, 1856 – June 23, 1931) was a 19th-century professional baseball shortstop.

Sources

1856 births
1931 deaths
Baseball players from Missouri
Major League Baseball shortstops
Altoona Mountain Citys players
Philadelphia Keystones players
Kansas City Cowboys (UA) players
New York Metropolitans players
19th-century baseball players
Chattanooga Lookouts players
Memphis Reds players
Scranton Indians players
Binghamton Crickets (1880s) players
Eau Claire (minor league baseball) players
Dallas Hams players
Houston Babies players
New Orleans Pelicans (baseball) players
Waco Babies players
Waco Texans players
Galveston Sand Crabs players
Fort Worth Panthers players
Spokane (minor league baseball) players